Beautiful Women Wake Up Early is a 2012 film, drama  written, produced and directed by Keith D Bracker. It premiered at  New York International Film Festival — Los Angeles edition at Raleigh Studios in Los Angeles on September 15, 2012. It has won an Award for Best Experimental Short at the New York International Film Festival — LA edition.

Plot
Beautiful Women Wake Up Early is an experimental piece that looks at the lives of several women—a model, a panic attack stricken woman, a musician, a writer, a romantic ageing woman, an inspired actress, an older theater actress–and how they try to cope with vanity, beauty, death, ageing, gender complexities.

Cast

Main
Aija Terauda as Vivien 
Raimonda Skeryte as Gunta
Connie Romano as Aunt Olivia
Sarah Himadeh as Melanie
Joy Caldwell as Monica
Maria Catalano as Sophia
Nicole Pesce as Denise

References

External links
 

Films shot in New Jersey
2012 drama films
2012 films
American drama films
2010s English-language films
2010s American films